AB Motoracing, the trading name of Abraham Motor Racing s.r.o., was a motorcycle racing team from Czech Republic that competed in the MotoGP, Moto2, 250cc and 125cc World Championships.

History
The team started racing in  running Aprilia motorcycles in the 125cc class with Karel Abraham and in the 250cc class with Jakub Smrž. In , Cardion AB Motoracing competed in the new Moto2 class, using RSV and FTR chassis. Abraham took his and his team's first victory in Valencia.

For 2013 the team switched to an ART-Aprilia CRT bike.

The team was headed by Karel Abraham Sr., the owner of the Masaryk Circuit – which hosts the Czech Republic Grand Prix – and his son Karel Abraham was the only rider for the team, the first Czech team with a Czech rider in MotoGP.

Results

Riders results

Team results
(key) (Races in bold indicate pole position; races in italics indicate fastest lap)

Notes

References

External links

 

Motorcycle racing teams
Motorcycle racing teams established in 2006
2006 establishments in the Czech Republic
Motorcycle racing teams disestablished in 2015
2015 disestablishments in the Czech Republic